Robert Iscove is a Canadian film and television director, television producer and a choreographer.

Filmography
 Love and Larceny (1985, TV)
 The Lawrenceville Stories (1987-1989, miniseries)
 Shattered Dreams (1990, TV)
 Mission of the Shark (1991, TV)
 Breaking the Silence (1992, TV)
 Without Warning (1994, TV)
 Cinderella (1997, TV)
 She's All That (1999)
 Boys and Girls (2000)
 Firestarter: Rekindled (2002, TV)
 From Justin to Kelly (2003)
 Spectacular! (2009, TV)
 Love N' Dancing (2009)
 Whiskey Business (2012, TV)

References

External links
 

Canadian choreographers
Canadian television directors
Canadian television producers
Living people
Year of birth missing (living people)